Richard Lee Wallace (born February 27, 1936) is an American educator and former chancellor of the University of Missouri in Columbia, Missouri.  He is the 20th chief executive officer of the Columbia campus and sixth since the creation of the University of Missouri System.  Wallace holds bachelor's and master's degrees from Northwestern University and a doctorate in economics from Vanderbilt University.  In addition to holding the position of chancellor Wallace served on the board of directors for both the Big 12 Conference and the NCAA Division-I Committee on Athletic Certification.  He was named Chancellor Emeritus of the University of Missouri upon his retirement

See also
History of the University of Missouri

References

Living people
Leaders of the University of Missouri
People from Columbia, Missouri
University of Missouri faculty
Northwestern University alumni
Vanderbilt University alumni
1936 births